Star Trek is an American science fiction media franchise created by Gene Roddenberry, which began with the eponymous 1960s television series and quickly became a worldwide pop-culture phenomenon. The franchise has expanded into various films, television series, video games, novels, and comic books. With an estimated $10.6 billion in revenue, it is one of the most recognizable and highest-grossing media franchises of all time.

The franchise began with Star Trek: The Original Series, which debuted in the US on September 8, 1966, and aired for three seasons on NBC. It was first broadcast on September 6, 1966, on Canada's CTV network. It followed the voyages of the crew of the starship USS Enterprise, a space exploration vessel built by the United Federation of Planets in the 23rd century, on a mission "to explore strange new worlds, to seek out new life and new civilizations, to boldly go where no man has gone before". In creating Star Trek, Roddenberry was inspired by C. S. Forester's Horatio Hornblower series of novels, Jonathan Swift 1726 novel Gulliver's Travels, the 1956 film Forbidden Planet, and television westerns such as Wagon Train.

The Star Trek canon includes the Original Series, 11 spin-off television series, and a film franchise; further adaptations also exist in several media. After the conclusion of the Original Series, the adventures of its characters continued in the 22-episode Star Trek: The Animated Series and six feature films. A television revival beginning in the 1980s saw three sequel series and a prequel: The Next Generation, following the crew of a new starship Enterprise a century after the original series; Deep Space Nine and Voyager, set in the same era as the Next Generation; and Enterprise, set before the original series in the early days of human interstellar travel. The adventures of the Next Generation crew continued in four additional feature films. In 2009, the film franchise underwent a reboot, creating an alternate continuity known as the Kelvin timeline; three films have been set in this continuity. The newest Star Trek television revival, beginning in 2017, includes the series Discovery, Picard, Short Treks, Lower Decks, Prodigy, and Strange New Worlds, streaming exclusively on digital platforms.

Star Trek has been a cult phenomenon for decades. Fans of the franchise are called "Trekkies" or "Trekkers". The franchise spans a wide range of spin-offs including games, figurines, novels, toys, and comics. From 1998 to 2008, there was a Star Trek–themed attraction in Las Vegas. At least two museum exhibits of props travel the world. The constructed language Klingon was created for the franchise. Several Star Trek parodies have been made, and viewers have produced several fan productions.

Star Trek is noted for its cultural influence beyond works of science fiction. The franchise is also notable for its progressive civil-rights stances. The Original Series included one of the first multiracial casts on US television.

Conception and setting 

As early as 1964, Gene Roddenberry drafted a proposal for the science fiction series that would become Star Trek. Although he publicly marketed it as a Western in outer space—a so-called "Wagon Train to the stars"—he privately told friends that he was modeling it on Jonathan Swift's Gulliver's Travels, intending each episode to act on two levels: as a suspenseful adventure story and as a morality tale.

Most Star Trek stories depict the adventures of humans and aliens who serve in Starfleet, the space-borne humanitarian and peacekeeping armada of the United Federation of Planets. The protagonists have altruistic values, and must apply these ideals to difficult dilemmas.

Many of the conflicts and political dimensions of Star Trek are allegories of contemporary cultural realities. The Original Series addressed issues of the 1960s, just as later spin-offs have tackled issues of their respective decades. Issues depicted in the various series include war and peace, the value of personal loyalty, authoritarianism, imperialism, class warfare, economics, racism, religion, human rights, sexism, feminism, and the role of technology. Roddenberry stated: "[By creating] a new world with new rules, I could make statements about sex, religion, Vietnam, politics, and intercontinental missiles. Indeed, we did make them on Star Trek: we were sending messages and fortunately they all got by the network. If you talked about purple people on a far off planet, they (the television network) never really caught on. They were more concerned about cleavage. They actually would send a censor down to the set to measure a woman's cleavage to make sure too much of her breast wasn't showing."

Roddenberry intended the show to have a progressive political agenda reflective of the emerging counter-culture of the youth movement, though he was not fully forthcoming to the networks about this. He wanted Star Trek to show what humanity might develop into, if it would learn from the lessons of the past, most specifically by ending violence. An extreme example is the alien species known as the Vulcans, who had a violent past but learned to control their emotions. Roddenberry also gave Star Trek an anti-war message and depicted the United Federation of Planets as an ideal, optimistic version of the United Nations. His efforts were opposed by the network because of concerns over marketability, e.g., they opposed Roddenberry's insistence that Enterprise have a racially diverse crew.

History and production

Timeline

The Original Series era (1965–1969) 

In early 1964, Roddenberry presented a brief treatment for a television series to Desilu Productions, calling it "a Wagon Train to the stars." Desilu studio head Lucille Ball was instrumental in approving production of the series. The studio worked with Roddenberry to develop the treatment into a script, which was then pitched to NBC.

NBC paid to make a pilot, "The Cage", starring Jeffrey Hunter as Enterprise Captain Christopher Pike. NBC rejected "The Cage", but the executives were still impressed with the concept, and made the unusual decision to commission a second pilot: "Where No Man Has Gone Before".

While the show initially enjoyed high ratings, the average rating of the show at the end of its first season dropped to 52nd out of 94 programs. Unhappy with the show's ratings, NBC threatened to cancel the show during its second season. The show's fan base, led by Bjo Trimble, conducted an unprecedented letter-writing campaign, petitioning the network to keep the show on the air. NBC renewed the show, but moved it from primetime to the "Friday night death slot", and substantially reduced its budget. In protest, Roddenberry resigned as producer and reduced his direct involvement in Star Trek, which led to Fred Freiberger becoming producer for the show's third and final season. Despite another letter-writing campaign, NBC canceled the series after three seasons and 79 episodes.

Post–Original Series rebirth (1969–1991) 
After the original series was canceled, Desilu, which by then had been renamed Paramount Television, licensed the broadcast syndication rights to help recoup the production losses. Reruns began in late 1969, and by the late 1970s the series aired in over 150 domestic and 60 international markets. This helped Star Trek develop a cult following greater than its popularity during its original run.

One sign of the series' growing popularity was the first Star Trek convention, which occurred on January 21–23, 1972 in New York City. Although the original expectation was that only a few hundred fans would attend, several thousand turned up. Star Trek fans continue to attend similar conventions worldwide.

The series' newfound success led to the idea of reviving the franchise. Filmation with Paramount Television produced the first post–original series show, Star Trek: The Animated Series, featuring the cast of the original series reprising their roles. It ran on NBC for 22 half-hour episodes over two seasons on Saturday mornings from 1973 to 1974. Although short-lived, typical for animated productions in that time slot during that period, the series garnered the franchise's only Emmy Award in a "Best Series" category—specifically Outstanding Entertainment Children's Series; later Emmy awards for the franchise would be in technical categories. Paramount Pictures and Roddenberry began developing a new series, Star Trek: Phase II, in May 1975 in response to the franchise's newfound popularity. Work on the series ended when the proposed Paramount Television Service folded.

Following the success of the science fiction movies Star Wars and Close Encounters of the Third Kind, Paramount adapted the planned pilot episode of Phase II into the feature film Star Trek: The Motion Picture. The film opened in North America on December 7, 1979, with mixed reviews from critics. The film earned $139 million worldwide, below expectations but enough for Paramount to create a sequel. The studio forced Roddenberry to relinquish creative control of future sequels.

The success of the sequel, Star Trek II: The Wrath of Khan, reversed the fortunes of the franchise. While the sequel grossed less than the first movie, The Wrath of Khans lower production costs made it net more profit. Paramount produced six Star Trek feature films between 1979 and 1991, each featuring the Original Series cast in their original roles.

In response to the popularity of Star Trek feature films, the franchise returned to television with Star Trek: The Next Generation in 1987. Paramount chose to distribute it as a first-run syndication show rather than a network show. The Next Generation was set a century after the original series, following the adventures of a new starship Enterprise with a new crew.

Post-Roddenberry television era (1991–2005) 

Following Star Trek: The Motion Picture, Roddenberry's role was changed from producer to creative consultant with minimal input to the films while being heavily involved with the creation of The Next Generation. Roddenberry died on October 24, 1991, giving executive producer Rick Berman control of the franchise. Star Trek had become known to those within Paramount as "the franchise", because of its great success and recurring role as a tent pole for the studio when other projects failed. The Next Generation had the highest ratings of any Star Trek series and became the most syndicated show during the last years of its original seven-season run. In response to the Next Generation success, Paramount released a spin-off series, Deep Space Nine, in 1993. While never as popular as the Next Generation, the series had sufficient ratings for it to last seven seasons.

In January 1995, a few months after the Next Generation ended, Paramount released a fourth television series, Voyager. Star Trek production reached a peak in the mid-1990s with Deep Space Nine and Voyager airing concurrently and three of the four Next Generation-based feature films released in 1994, 1996, and 1998. By 1998, Star Trek was Paramount's most important property and the profits of "the franchise" funded a significant portion of the studio's operations. Voyager became the flagship show of the new United Paramount Network (UPN) and thus the first major network Star Trek series since the original.

After Voyager ended, UPN produced Enterprise, a prequel series. Enterprise did not enjoy the high ratings of its predecessors and UPN threatened to cancel it after the series' third season. Fans launched a campaign reminiscent of the one that saved the third season of the Original Series. Paramount renewed Enterprise for a fourth season, but moved it to the Friday night death slot. Like the Original Series, Enterprises ratings dropped during this time slot, and UPN cancelled Enterprise at the end of its fourth season. Enterprise aired its final episode on May 13, 2005. A fan group, "Save Enterprise", attempted to save the series and tried to raise $30 million to privately finance a fifth season of Enterprise. Though the effort garnered considerable press, the fan drive failed to save the series. The cancellation of Enterprise ended an eighteen-year continuous production run of Star Trek programming on television. The poor box office performance in 2002 of the film Nemesis cast an uncertain light upon the future of the franchise. Paramount relieved Berman, the franchise producer, of control of Star Trek.

Reboot (Kelvin timeline) film series (2009–2016) 
Paramount hired a new creative team, in 2007, to reinvigorate the franchise on the big screen. Writers Roberto Orci and Alex Kurtzman and producer J. J. Abrams had the freedom to reinvent the feel of the franchise. The team created the franchise's eleventh film, Star Trek, releasing it in May 2009. The film featured a new cast portraying the crew of the original show. Star Trek was a prequel of the original series set in an alternate timeline, later named the Kelvin Timeline. This gave the film and sequels freedom from the need to conform to the franchise's canonical timeline and minimized the impact these films would have on CBS's portion of the franchise. The eleventh Star Trek film's marketing campaign targeted non-fans, stating in the film's advertisements that "this is not your father's Star Trek".

The film earned considerable critical and financial success, grossing (in inflation-adjusted dollars) more box office sales than any previous Star Trek film. The plaudits include the franchise's first Academy Award (for makeup). Two sequels were released. The first sequel, Star Trek Into Darkness, premiered in the spring of 2013. While the film did not earn as much in the North American box office as its predecessor, internationally, in terms of box office receipts, Into Darkness is the most successful of the franchise. The thirteenth film, Star Trek Beyond, was released on July 22, 2016. The film had many pre-production problems and its script went through several rewrites. While receiving positive reviews, Star Trek Beyond disappointed in the box office.

Expansion of the Star Trek Universe (2017–present) 

CBS turned down several proposals in the mid-2000s to restart the franchise on the small screen. Proposals included pitches from film director Bryan Singer, Babylon 5 creator J. Michael Straczynski, and Trek actors Jonathan Frakes and William Shatner. While CBS was not creating new Star Trek for network television, the ease of access to Star Trek content on new streaming services such as Netflix and Amazon Prime Video introduced a new set of fans to the franchise. CBS eventually sought to capitalize on this trend, and brought the franchise back to the small screen with the series Star Trek: Discovery to help launch and draw subscribers to its streaming service CBS All Access. Discovery's first season premiered on September 24, 2017. While Discovery is shown in the United States exclusively on Paramount+ (formerly CBS All Access), for its first three seasons, Netflix, in exchange for funding the production costs of the show, owned the international screening rights for the show. This Netflix distribution and production deal ended right before the fourth season premiere of Discovery in November 2021. Discovery has since been exclusive to Paramount Global owned platforms.

In June 2018, after becoming sole showrunner of Discovery, Kurtzman signed a five-year overall deal with CBS Television Studios to expand the Star Trek franchise beyond Discovery to several new series, miniseries, and animated series. Kurtzman wanted to "open this world up" and create multiple series set in the same universe but with their own "unique storytelling and distinct cinematic feel", an approach that he compared to the Marvel Cinematic Universe. However, the franchise would not tell a single story across multiple series, allowing audiences to watch each series without having to see all of the others. CBS and Kurtzman refer to this expanded franchise as the Star Trek Universe. In October 2020, Kurtzman stated that Star Trek series have been planned through 2027. Kurtzman cautioned that this was a preliminary plan, but it was necessary to plan so far out due to the long production schedules for each series.

The second series of the expansion of the Star Trek Universe, Star Trek: Picard, features Patrick Stewart reprising the character Jean-Luc Picard from The Next Generation. Picard premiered on CBS All Access on January 23, 2020. Unlike Discovery, Amazon Prime Video streams Picard internationally. CBS has also released two seasons of Star Trek: Short Treks, a series of standalone mini-episodes which air between Discovery and Picard seasons. A new live-action series, Star Trek: Strange New Worlds, a spinoff of the second season of Discovery and prequel to the original series, premiered on May 5, 2022. Lower Decks, an animated adult comedy series, was released on August 6, 2020 on CBS All Access. Another animated series, Star Trek: Prodigy, premiered on the rebranded service Paramount+ first on October 28, 2021, and on December 17, 2021 on Nickelodeon. Prodigy is the first Star Trek series to specifically target younger audiences, and is the franchise's first fully computer animated series.

Paramount Global announced in February 2021 that the Star Trek Universe would be available on Paramount+, including Discovery, Picard, Lower Decks, Prodigy, and Strange New Worlds. The service's Executive Vice President of Development and Programming, Julie McNamara, said they were unlikely to expand the slate of Star Trek series until one of these five shows ended, which could happen when a series' story runs its course or a lead actor's contract expires. McNamara hoped to release a new season of Star Trek each quarter. Discussing the next phase of the franchise, Kurtzman said several projects were in development and the success of Prodigy could lead to more young audience-focused series. He added that future live-action series would likely explore new parts of the Star Trek franchise's timeline in a similar way to Discoverys jump to the far future in its third season. Kurtzman also felt there would be opportunities for future series to be associated to other Paramount Global brands such as BET and Showtime, similar to Prodigy being developed for Nickelodeon. Monthly meetings with the showrunners of each new series are held to allow coordination between the different series and ensure that "they're not stepping on each other's toes" by using the same elements of the universe, according to Kurtzman.

 Television 

 The Original Series (1966–1969) Star Trek: The Original Series, frequently abbreviated as TOS, debuted on NBC on September 8, 1966. The show tells the tale of the crew of the starship  and its five-year mission "to boldly go where no man has gone before", under the command of Captain James T. Kirk. During the series's initial run, it was nominated for Hugo Award for Best Dramatic Presentation multiple times, and won twice. Cast included:

NBC canceled the show after three seasons; the last original episode aired on June 3, 1969. A petition near the end of the second season to save the show signed by many Caltech students and its multiple Hugo nominations would, however, indicate that despite low Nielsen ratings, it was highly popular with science fiction fans and engineering students. The series later became popular in reruns and found a cult following.

The Animated Series (1973–1974) 

Star Trek: The Animated Series, produced by Filmation, ran for two seasons from 1973 to 1974. Most of the original cast performed the voices of their characters from the Original Series, and some of the writers who worked on the Original Series returned. While the animated format allowed the producers to create more exotic alien landscapes and life forms, animation errors and liberal reuse of shots and musical cues have tarnished the series' reputation. Gene Roddenberry often spoke of it as non-canon, though more recent productions have treated it as canonical. The cast included:

The Animated Series won Star Treks first Emmy Award on May 15, 1975. The series briefly returned to television in the mid-1980s on the children's cable network Nickelodeon, and again on Sci-Fi Channel in the mid-90s. The complete series was released on LaserDisc during the 1980s. The complete series was first released in the U.S. on eleven volumes of VHS tapes in 1989. All 22 episodes were released on DVD in 2006.

The Next Generation (1987–1994) 

Star Trek: The Next Generation, frequently abbreviated as TNG, takes place about a century after the Original Series (2364–2370). It features a new starship, and a new crew:

The series premiered on September 28, 1987, and ran for seven seasons. It had the highest ratings of any of the Star Trek series and became the highest rated syndicated show near the end of its run, allowing it to act as a springboard for other series. Many relationships and races introduced in the Next Generation became the basis for episodes in Deep Space Nine and Voyager. The series earned several Emmy awards and nominations—including Best Dramatic Series for its final season—two Hugo Awards, and a Peabody Award for Outstanding Television Programming for one episode.

Deep Space Nine (1993–1999) 

Star Trek: Deep Space Nine, frequently abbreviated as DS9, takes place during the last years of and immediately after the Next Generation (2369–2375). It debuted the week of January 3, 1993, and ran for seven seasons. Unlike the other Star Trek series, Deep Space Nine was set primarily on a space station of the same name rather than aboard a starship. The cast included:

The show begins after the conclusion of the brutal Cardassian occupation of the planet Bajor, introduced in The Next Generation. The liberated Bajoran people ask the United Federation of Planets to help run a space station near Bajor. After the Federation takes control of the station, the protagonists of the show discover a uniquely stable wormhole that provides immediate access to the distant Gamma Quadrant, making Bajor and the station a strategically important location. The show chronicles the events of the station's crew, led by Commander Benjamin Sisko (Avery Brooks), and Major Kira Nerys (Nana Visitor).

Deep Space Nine stands apart from earlier Trek series for its lengthy serialized storytelling, character conflicts, and religious themes—all elements praised by critics and audiences, but which Roddenberry had forbidden as a producer of the original series and the Next Generation.

Voyager (1995–2001) 

Star Trek: Voyager ran for seven seasons, airing from January 16, 1995 to May 23, 2001. It features Kate Mulgrew as Captain Kathryn Janeway, the first female commanding officer in a leading role of a Star Trek series. Cast included:

Voyager takes place during the same time period as Deep Space Nine and the years immediately following (2371–2378). The militant renegade movement known as the Maquis, introduced on Deep Space Nine, is part of the premise of Voyager. The premiere episode has the USS Voyager and its crew pursuing a Maquis ship; both ships become stranded in the Delta Quadrant about 70,000 light-years from Earth. Faced with a 75-year voyage to Earth, the crews must work together to overcome challenges and shorten the voyage on their long and perilous journey home.

Like Deep Space Nine, early seasons of Voyager feature more conflict between its crew members than seen in The Next Generation. Such conflict often arose from friction between "by-the-book" Starfleet crew and rebellious Maquis fugitives forced by circumstance to work together. The starship Voyager, isolated from its home, faced new cultures and dilemmas not possible in shows based in the Alpha Quadrant. Later seasons brought in an influx of characters and cultures from prior shows, such as the Borg, Q, the Ferengi, Romulans, Klingons, Cardassians and cast members of the Next Generation.

Enterprise (2001–2005) 

Star Trek: Enterprise, originally titled Enterprise, is a prequel to the original Star Trek series. It aired from September 26, 2001 to May 13, 2005 on UPN. Enterprise is set about a century earlier than The Original Series, early in the fictional history of humanity's space exploration and shortly before the creation of the United Federation of Planets. The show follows the crew of an earlier starship  on Earth's first deep-space exploration mission. The cast included:

Initially, Enterprise featured self-contained episodes, much like the Original Series, Next Generation and Voyager. The third season comprised a single narrative arc. The fourth and final season consisted of several three- and four-episode arcs, which explored the origins of some elements of previous series, and resolved some continuity errors with The Original Series.

Ratings for Enterprise started strong but declined rapidly. Although critics received the fourth season well, both fans and the cast reviled the series finale, partly because of the episode's focus on the guest appearance of members of the Next Generation cast. The cancellation of Enterprise ended an 18-year run of new Star Trek series, which began with the Next Generation in 1987.

Discovery (2017–present) 

Star Trek: Discovery is the first series of the streaming television Star Trek revival; it begins as a prequel to the Original Series, set roughly ten years prior. It premiered September 24, 2017 in the United States and Canada on CBS. The series is shown on Paramount+ in the United States; elsewhere, Netflix distributes the series worldwide, except for Canada. The cast includes:

Discovery is a serialized drama in which each season follows a single overarching narrative. In a departure from previous Star Trek series, the primary protagonist, Michael Burnham (portrayed by Martin-Green), is not the captain of the titular ship for the first few seasons. The first season follows a war between the United Federation of Planets and the Klingon Empire, instigated by Burnham, who is court-martialed, demoted, and assigned to the starship Discovery; later seasons follow the crew of Discovery on other adventures.

Short Treks (2018–2020) 

Star Trek: Short Treks is a short film anthology companion series initially exploring settings and characters from Discovery. Later episodes feature the crew of the Enterprise under the command of Christopher Pike. The final episode of the second season serves as a teaser for Picard.

Picard (2020–2023)

Star Trek: Picard, like Discovery, is a serialized drama created for CBS All Access; it premiered on January 23, 2020. Set about 30 years after The Next Generation, the series sees Patrick Stewart reprise his TNG role of Jean-Luc Picard. The first season follows Picard in his retirement, seeking redemption for what he sees as his past failings, as he goes on an adventure to save the daughter of his late crewmate Data. The cast includes:

Lower Decks (2020–present)

Star Trek: Lower Decks is an animated adult comedy series created by the Rick and Morty writer Mike McMahan. The series follows the support crew of "one of Starfleet's least important ships." The series premiered on August 6, 2020 on CBS All Access. The cast includes:

Prodigy (2021–present)

Star Trek: Prodigy is an animated series created by Kevin and Dan Hageman for Paramount+, and the cable channel Nickelodeon. The series follows a group of teenagers who use an abandoned starship to search for adventure. The series premiered on October 28, 2021. The cast includes:

Strange New Worlds (2022–present)

Star Trek: Strange New Worlds is a spinoff of Discovery and a prequel to the Original Series, created by Akiva Goldsman, Alex Kurtzman, and Jenny Lumet for Paramount+. It premiered in May 2022. It portrays the adventures of the U.S.S. Enterprise prior to James Kirk's captaincy, and focuses on episodic storytelling in contrast to the serialized narratives of Discovery. The Enterprises crew in this series features several characters who were first introduced in the Original Series, now played by new actors, including Ethan Peck, Anson Mount and Rebecca Romijn reprising their Discovery season 2 roles as Spock, Captain Pike and Number One respectively. The cast includes:

 In development 

CBS and Star Trek producers Alex Kurtzman and Heather Kadin have announced that further animated and live-action television series are currently in development.

In February 2021, it was announced that further series would only move forward once at least one of the current slate of series (Discovery, Picard, Lower Decks, Prodigy, and Strange New Worlds) concludes its run. One such series includes Michelle Yeoh reprising her role as the mirror universe's Philippa Georgiou of Section 31 from Discovery. The expanded franchise reportedly also includes several series, including a series being developed by Stephanie Savage and Josh Schwartz that is set at Starfleet Academy.

 Film 

Paramount Pictures has produced thirteen Star Trek feature films, the most recent being released in July 2016. The first six films continue the adventures of the cast of the Original Series; the seventh film, Generations, was intended as a transition from original cast to the cast of the Next Generation; the next three films focused completely on the Next Generation cast.

The eleventh film and its sequels occur in an alternate timeline with a new cast portraying the Original Series characters. Leonard Nimoy portrayed an elderly Spock in the films, providing a narrative link to what became known as the Prime Timeline. The alternate timeline was named "The Kelvin Timeline" by Star Trek Encyclopedia writers Michael and Denise Okuda, in honor of the starship USS Kelvin which was first seen in the 2009 film.

Films in development

Though initially reported as being placed on hold, Paramount confirmed in September 2020 that they haven't cancelled any of the Star Trek films that are currently in development. This includes the Tarantino film, Star Trek 4 with the Kelvin Timeline cast, and Noah Hawley's film

 Untitled Mark L. Smith film: In December 2017, an R-rated Star Trek film was announced as in-development with a script written by Mark L. Smith, from an original story pitch by Quentin Tarantino and J. J. Abrams. Though the studio was courting Tarantino to serve as director, the filmmaker decided to pass on the project. The plot takes place primarily on Earth during the '30s in a mobster setting, and was based on an episode from the original Star Trek television series. The studio is open to adapting the script with another director.
 Star Trek 4: In April 2018, a fourth film in The Kelvin Timeline was announced to be in development with S. J. Clarkson hired as director. The script co-written by J. D. Payne and Patrick McKay, focused on Captain Kirk and his deceased father, George Kirk. The project was delayed due to scheduling conflicts and additional work on the script was required. In July 2021, it was announced that the next film would be directed by Matt Shakman, using a script by Lindsey Beer and Geneva Robertson-Dworet. In February 2022, at the Paramount Global Investors' Day event, it was officially announced that Star Trek 4 will begin production in Spring of 2022. The main cast is in negotiations to return in their respective roles. Josh Friedman and Cameron Squires were hired to do a rewrite of the previous draft of the script. The project will be a joint-venture production between Paramount Pictures and Bad Robot Productions, with J. J. Abrams and Lindsey Weber signed on as producers.
 Untitled Noah Hawley film: In November 2019, an additional film was announced as being in-development with Noah Hawley signed onto the project as writer/director. By August 2020, the project was placed on hold, while studio executives decide which project will be green-lit first.
 Untitled Kalinda Vasquez film: In March 2021, it was announced that another film is in development. Kalinda Vasquez, who previously worked on Star Trek: Discovery, will serve as screenwriter. The project will be a joint-venture production between Paramount Pictures and Bad Robot Productions, with J. J. Abrams serving as producer.
 Untitled Nicholas Meyer film project: In March 2021, Nicholas Meyer announced that he and Steven Charles-Jaffe had written a treatment for a Star Trek film that takes place between The Motion Picture and Wrath of Khan. The duo had proposed the project within the prior year to Alex Kurtzman, J. J. Abrams, and Paramount Pictures' Emma Watts.

 Merchandise 

Many licensed products are based on the Star Trek franchise. Merchandising is very lucrative for both studio and actors; by 1986 Nimoy had earned more than $500,000 from royalties. Products include novels, comic books, video games, and other materials, which are generally considered non-canon. Star Trek merchandise generated $4 billion for Paramount by 2002.

 Books 

Since 1967, hundreds of original novels, short stories, and television and movie adaptations have been published. The first original Star Trek novel was Mission to Horatius by Mack Reynolds, which was published in hardcover by Whitman Books in 1968.

In 1968, Gene Roddenberry cooperated with Stephen Edward Poe, writing as Stephen Whitfield, on the nonfiction book The Making of Star Trek for Ballantine Books.

Among the most recent is the Star Trek Collection of Little Golden Books. Three titles were published by Random House in 2019, a fourth is scheduled for July 2020.

The first publisher of Star Trek fiction aimed at adult readers was Bantam Books. James Blish wrote adaptations of episodes of the original series in twelve volumes from 1967 to 1977; in 1970, he wrote the first original Star Trek novel published by Bantam, Spock Must Die!.

Pocket Books published subsequent Star Trek novels. Prolific Star Trek novelists include Peter David, Diane Carey, Keith DeCandido, J.M. Dillard, Diane Duane, Michael Jan Friedman, and Judith and Garfield Reeves-Stevens. Several actors from the television series have also written or co-written books featuring their respective characters: William Shatner, John de Lancie, Andrew J. Robinson, J. G. Hertzler and Armin Shimerman. Voyager producer Jeri Taylor wrote two novels detailing the personal histories of Voyager characters. Screenplay writers David Gerrold, D. C. Fontana, and Melinda Snodgrass have also penned books.

A 2014 scholarly work Newton Lee discussed the actualization of Star Trek's holodeck in the future by making extensive use of artificial intelligence and cyborgs.

 Comics 

Star Trek-based comics have been issued almost continuously since 1967, published by Marvel, DC, Malibu, Wildstorm, and Gold Key, among others. In 2009, Tokyopop produced an anthology of Next Generation-based stories presented in the style of Japanese manga. In 2006, IDW Publishing secured publishing rights to Star Trek comics and issued a prequel to the 2009 film, Star Trek: Countdown. In 2012, IDW published the first volume of Star Trek – The Newspaper Strip, featuring the work of Thomas Warkentin. As of 2020, IDS continues to produce new titles.

 Games 

The Star Trek franchise has numerous games in many formats. Beginning in 1967 with a board game based on the original series and continuing through today with online and DVD games, Star Trek games continue to be popular among fans.

Video games based on the series include Star Trek: Legacy and Star Trek: Conquest. An MMORPG based on Star Trek called Star Trek Online was developed by Cryptic Studios and published by Perfect World. It is set during the Next Generation era, about 30 years after the events of Star Trek: Nemesis. The most recent video game was set in the alternate timeline from Abrams's Star Trek.

On June 8, 2010, WizKids announced the development of a Star Trek collectible miniatures game using the HeroClix game system.

On December 9, 2021, Star Trek: Resurgence, a narrative adventure video game set in the Next Generation era, was announced by Dramatic Labs.

 Magazines 
Star Trek has led directly or indirectly to the creation of a number of magazines which focus either on science fiction or specifically on Star Trek. Starlog was a magazine which was founded in the 1970s. Initially, its focus was on Star Trek actors, but then it expanded its scope. Star Trek: The Magazine was a magazine published in the U.S. that ceased publication in 2003. Star Trek Magazine, originally published as Star Trek Monthly''' by Titan Magazines for the United Kingdom market, began in February 1995. The magazine has since expanded to worldwide distribution.

Other magazines through the years included professional, as well as magazines published by fans, or fanzines.

 Cultural impact 

The Star Trek media franchise is a multibillion-dollar industry, owned by Paramount Global. Gene Roddenberry sold Star Trek to NBC as a classic adventure drama; he pitched the show as "Wagon Train to the Stars" and as Horatio Hornblower in Space. The opening line, "to boldly go where no man has gone before," was taken almost verbatim from a U.S. White House booklet on space produced after the Sputnik flight in 1957.Star Trek and its spin-offs have proven highly popular in syndication and was broadcast worldwide. The show's cultural impact goes far beyond its longevity and profitability. Star Trek conventions have become popular among its fans, who call themselves "trekkie or "trekkers". An entire subculture has grown up around the franchise, which was documented in the film Trekkies. Star Trek was ranked most popular cult show by TV Guide. The franchise has also garnered many comparisons of the Star Wars franchise being rivals in the science fiction genre with many fans and scholars.

The Star Trek franchise inspired some designers of technologies, the Palm PDA and the handheld mobile phone. Michael Jones, Chief technologist of Google Earth, has cited the tricorder's mapping capability as one inspiration in the development of Keyhole/Google Earth. The Tricorder X Prize, a contest to build a medical tricorder device was announced in 2012. Ten finalists were selected in 2014, and the winner was to be selected in January 2016. However, no team managed to reach the required criteria. Star Trek also brought teleportation to popular attention with its depiction of "matter-energy transport", with the famously misquoted phrase "Beam me up, Scotty" entering the vernacular. The Star Trek replicator is credited in the scientific literature with inspiring the field of diatom nanotechnology. In 1976, following a letter-writing campaign, NASA named its prototype space shuttle Enterprise, after the fictional starship. Later, the introductory sequence to Star Trek: Enterprise included footage of this shuttle which, along with images of a naval sailing vessel called Enterprise, depicted the advancement of human transportation technology.

Beyond Star Trek fictional innovations, its contributions to television history included a multicultural and multiracial cast. While more common in subsequent years, in the 1960s it was controversial to feature an Enterprise crew that included a Japanese helmsman, a Russian navigator, and a black female communications officer. Captain Kirk's and Lt. Uhura's kiss, in the episode "Plato's Stepchildren", was also daring, and is often mis-cited as being American television's first scripted, interracial kiss, even though several other interracial kisses predated this one. Nichelle Nichols, who played the communications officer, said that the day after she told Roddenberry of her plan to leave the series, she was told a big fan wanted to meet her while attending a NAACP dinner party:
 
After the show, Nichols used this public standing to speak for women and people of color and against their exclusion from the US human space program; NASA reacted by asking her to find people for its future Space Shuttle program. Nichols proceeded and successfully brought the first non-white people and women into the US space program, working in this quality for NASA from the late 1970s until the late 1980s.

In 2020, the US effort to develop a vaccine to protect against COVID-19 was named Operation Warp Speed, which was suggested by a Star Trek fan, Dr. Peter Marks. Dr. Marks leads the unit at the Food and Drug Administration which approves vaccines and therapies.

 Parodies 
Early parodies of Star Trek included a famous sketch on Saturday Night Live titled "The Last Voyage of the Starship Enterprise", with John Belushi as Kirk, Chevy Chase as Spock and Dan Aykroyd as McCoy. In the 1980s, Saturday Night Live did a sketch with William Shatner reprising his Captain Kirk role in The Restaurant Enterprise, preceded by a sketch in which he played himself at a Trek convention angrily telling fans to "Get a Life", a phrase that has become part of Trek folklore. In Living Color continued the tradition in a sketch where Captain Kirk is played by a fellow Canadian Jim Carrey.

A feature-length film that indirectly parodies Star Trek is Galaxy Quest. This film is based on the premise that aliens monitoring the broadcast of an Earth-based television series called Galaxy Quest, modeled heavily on Star Trek, believe that what they are seeing is real. Many Star Trek actors have been quoted saying that Galaxy Quest was a brilliant parody.Star Trek has been blended with Gilbert and Sullivan at least twice. The North Toronto Players presented a Star Trek adaptation of Gilbert & Sullivan titled H.M.S. Starship Pinafore: The Next Generation in 1991 and an adaptation by Jon Mullich of Gilbert and Sullivan's H.M.S. Pinafore that sets the operetta in the world of Star Trek has played in Los Angeles and was attended by series luminaries Nichelle Nichols, D.C. Fontana and David Gerrold. A similar blend of Gilbert and Sullivan and Star Trek was presented as a benefit concert in San Francisco by the Lamplighters in 2009. The show was titled Star Drek: The Generation After That. It presented an original story with Gilbert and Sullivan melodies.The Simpsons and Futurama television series and others have had many individual episodes parodying Star Trek or with Trek allusions. Black Mirror's Star Trek parody episode, "USS Callister", won four Emmy Awards, including the Outstanding Television Movie and Writing for a Limited Series, Movie or Drama, and was nominated for three more.

In August 2010, the members of the Internal Revenue Service created a Star Trek themed training video for a conference. Revealed to the public in 2013, the spoof along with parodies of other media franchises was cited as an example of the misuse of taxpayer funds in a congressional investigation.Star Trek has been parodied in several non-English movies, including the German Traumschiff Surprise – Periode 1 which features a gay version of the Original Series bridge crew and a Turkish film that spoofs that same series' episode "The Man Trap" in one of the series of films based on the character Turist Ömer. An entire series of films and novel parodies titled Star Wreck has been created in Finnish.The Orville is a comedy-drama science fiction television series created by Seth MacFarlane that premiered on September 10, 2017, on Fox. MacFarlane, a longtime fan of the franchise who previously guest-starred on an episode of Enterprise, created the series with a similar look and feel as the Star Trek series. MacFarlane has made references to Star Trek on his animated series Family Guy, where the Next Generation cast guest-starred in the episode "Not All Dogs Go to Heaven".Other Space is a science fiction comedy streaming series which premiered on Yahoo! Screen on April 14, 2015. Created by Paul Feig, it is set in the 22nd century and follows the dysfunctional crew of an exploratory spaceship who become trapped in an unknown universe.

 Fan productions 

Until 2016, Paramount Pictures and CBS permitted fan-produced films and episode-like clips to be produced. Several veteran Star Trek actors and writers participated in many of these productions. Several producers turned to crowdfunding, such as Kickstarter, to help with production and other costs.

Popular productions include: New Voyages (2004–2016) and Star Trek Continues (2013–2017). Additional productions include: Of Gods and Men (2008), originally released as a three-part web series, and Prelude to Axanar. Audio dramatizations such as The Continuing Mission (2007–2016) have also been published by fans.

In 2016, CBS published guidelines which restricted the scope of fan productions, such as limiting the length of episodes or films to fifteen minutes, limiting production budgets to $50,000, and preventing actors and technicians from previous Star Trek productions from participating. A number of highly publicized productions have since been cancelled or have gone abeyant.

 Documentaries 
Star Trek has been a popular subject for documentaries reviewing the history of the franchise. Some examples include:
 Journey’s End: Saga of Star Trek Next Generation, hosted by Jonathon Frakes, it reviewed the final season of the series and the upcoming Generations.Trekkies (1997), exploring the subculture of Star Trek fandom. 
 Star Trek: Beyond the Final Frontier (2007), exploring a giant Christie's auction of tens of thousand of Star Trek props, hosted by actor Leonard Nimoy. 
 The Center Seat (2016), an 85-minute special on Star Trek for its 50th anniversary, aired by the History network. 
 For the Love of Spock (2016), focusing on the history and impact of the character Spock.
 What We Left Behind (2019), about the production and legacy of Star Trek: Deep Space Nine.
 The Center Seat: 55 Years of Star Trek (2021), an eight-episode documentary series ordered by the cable network History covering the franchise's decades-long history. It was narrated by Gates McFadden, who was also one of the executive producers.

Some documentaries have been funded by the community by money raised by crowdfunding. What We Left Behind raised nearly $650,000 in this way, and a planned Voyager documentary raised $450,000 in 24 hours.

 Awards and honors 

Of the various science fiction awards for drama, only the Hugo Award dates back as far as the original series. In 1968, all five nominees for a Hugo Award were individual episodes of Star Trek, as were three of the five nominees in 1967. The only Star Trek series not to receive a Hugo Award nomination are the Animated Series and Voyager, though only the Original Series and Next Generation won in any nominated category. No Star Trek feature film has ever won a Hugo Award. In 2008, the fan-made Star Trek: New Voyages episode "World Enough and Time" was nominated for the Hugo Award for Best Short Drama.

One of the most successful films was Star Trek IV: The Voyage Home, which grossed a global total of $133 million against a $21 million budget.The Voyage Home garnered 11 nominations at the 14th annual Saturn Awards, tying Aliens for number of nominations. Nimoy and Shatner were nominated for best actor for their roles, and Catherine Hicks was nominated for best supporting actress. At the 59th Academy Awards, The Voyage Home was nominated for Best Cinematography, Sound (Terry Porter, David J. Hudson, Mel Metcalfe and Gene Cantamessa), Sound Effects Editing, and Original Score.

The episode "The Big Goodbye" in the first season of Star Trek: The Next Generation, in recognition of its "new standard of quality for first-run syndication", the episode was honored with a Peabody Award in 1987. "The Big Goodbye" was also nominated for two Emmy Awards in the categories of Outstanding Cinematography for a Series and Outstanding Costumes for a Series, with costume designer William Ware Theiss winning the award in the latter category.Star Trek (2009) won the Academy Award for Best Makeup and Hairstyling, the franchise's first Academy Award. In 2016, the franchise was listed in the Guinness World Records as the most successful science fiction television franchise in the world.

Examples:
List of awards and nominations received by Star Trek: Deep Space Nine
List of awards and nominations received by Star Trek: Enterprise
List of awards and nominations received by Star Trek: The Next Generation
List of awards and nominations received by Star Trek: The Original Series
List of awards and nominations received by Star Trek: Voyager

 Episode rankings 
 TV Guide (1996) 
In 1996, TV Guide published the following as the ten best Star Trek episodes for the franchise's 30th anniversary:
 "The City on the Edge of Forever" (The Original Series)
 "Amok Time" (The Original Series)
 "Mirror, Mirror" (The Original Series)
 "The Doomsday Machine" (The Original Series)
 "Journey to Babel" (The Original Series)
 "11001001" (The Next Generation)
 "Yesterday's Enterprise" (The Next Generation)
 "The Best of Both Worlds" (Part I) (The Next Generation)
 "Tapestry" (The Next Generation)
 "The Visitor" (Deep Space Nine)

 50th Anniversary Convention (2016) 
At the 50th Anniversary Star Trek Las Vegas (STLV) convention, in 2016, the following were voted by fans as the best episodes:
"The City on the Edge of Forever" (The Original Series)
 "In the Pale Moonlight" (Deep Space Nine)
 "The Inner Light" (The Next Generation)
 "Amok Time" (The Original Series)
 "Yesterday's Enterprise" (The Next Generation)
 "The Visitor" (Deep Space Nine)
 "Chain of Command" (The Next Generation)
 "Balance of Terror" (The Original Series)
 "In a Mirror, Darkly" (Enterprise)
 "The Magnificent Ferengi" (Deep Space Nine)

Additionally, fans voted the following as the worst episodes:
"These Are the Voyages..." (Enterprise)
 "Code of Honor" (The Next Generation)
 "Threshold" (Voyager)
 "Turnabout Intruder" (The Original Series)
 "Shades of Gray" (The Next Generation)
 "Sub Rosa" (The Next Generation)
 "And the Children Shall Lead" (The Original Series)
 "Move Along Home" (Deep Space Nine)
 "The Alternative Factor" (The Original Series)
 "Precious Cargo" (Enterprise)

Washington Post (2016)
In 2016, The Washington Post ranked the best live-action television episodes:
 "The Best of Both Worlds" (The Next Generation)
 "Darmok" (The Next Generation)
 "Balance of Terror" (The Original Series)
 "In the Pale Moonlight" (Deep Space Nine)
 "Chain of Command" (The Next Generation)
 "Yesterday's Enterprise" (The Next Generation)
 "The Doomsday Machine" (The Original Series)
 "The Measure of a Man" (The Next Generation)
 "Journey to Babel" (The Original Series)
 "First Contact" (The Next Generation)

 Corporate ownership Star Trek began as a joint-production of Norway Productions, owned by Roddenberry, and Desilu, owned by Desi Arnaz. The profit-sharing agreement for the series split proceeds between Norway, Desilu (later Paramount Television), William Shatner's production company, and the broadcast network, NBC. However, Star Trek lost money during its initial broadcast, and NBC did not expect to recoup its losses by selling the series into syndication, nor did Paramount. With NBC's approval, Paramount offered its share of the series to Roddenberry sometime in 1970. However, Roddenberry could not raise the $150,000 offered by the studio. Paramount would go on to license the series to television syndicators worldwide. NBC's remaining broadcast and distribution rights eventually returned to Paramount and Roddenberry sometime before 1986, which coincided with the development of what would become The Next Generation.

As for Desilu, the studio was acquired by Gulf+Western. It was then reorganized as the television production division of Paramount Pictures, which Gulf+Western had acquired in 1966. Gulf+Western sold its remaining industrial assets in 1989, renaming itself Paramount Communications. Sometime before 1986, Sumner Redstone had acquired a controlling stake of Viacom via his family's theater chain, National Amusements. Viacom was established in 1952 as a division of CBS responsible for syndicating the network's in-house productions, originally called CBS Films. In 1994, Viacom and Paramount Communications were merged. Viacom then merged with its former parent, CBS Corporation, in 1999. National Amusements and the Redstone family increased their stake in the combined company between 1999 and 2005.

 Split ownership (2005–2019) 
In 2005, the Redstone family reorganized Viacom, spinning off the conglomerate's assets as two independent groups: the new Viacom, and the new CBS Corporation. National Amusements and the Redstone family retained approximately 80% ownership of both CBS and Viacom. Star Trek was split between the two entities. The terms of this split were not known. However, CBS held all copyrights, marks, production assets, and film negatives, to all Star Trek television series. CBS also retained the rights to all likenesses, characters, names and settings, and stories, and the right to license Star Trek, and its spin-offs, to merchandisers, and publishers, etc. The rights were exercised via the new CBS Television Studios, which was carved out of the former Paramount Television.

Viacom, which housed Paramount Pictures, retained the feature film library, and exclusive rights to produce new feature films for a limited time. Viacom also retained home video distribution rights for all television series produced before 2005. However, home video editions of the various television series released after the split, as well as streaming video versions of episodes available worldwide, carried variants of the new CBS Television Studios livery in addition to the original Paramount Television Studios livery. It was unclear who retained the synchronization or streaming rights.

Rights and distribution issues, and the fraught relationship between the leadership at CBS, Viacom, and the National Amusements' board of directors, resulted in a number of delayed and or cancelled Star Trek productions between 2005 and 2019. Additionally, the development and release of the new Star Trek film, in 2009, was met with resistance by executives at CBS, as was Into Darkness (2013) and Beyond (2016), which affected merchandising, tie-in media, and promotion for the new films. During this period, both CBS and Viacom continued to list Star Trek'' as an important asset in their prospectus to investors, and in corporate filings made to the Securities and Exchange Commission.

Current ownership 
While several attempts were made to merge Viacom and CBS, power struggles between the major stakeholders of the companies prevented this from happening. In 2019, after the resignation of CBS CEO Leslie Moonves, negotiations to merge CBS and Viacom began in earnest. These negotiations were led by Shari Redstone, chairman of the National Amusements, and Joe Ianniello, then CEO of Viacom. On August 13, 2019, CBS and Viacom boards of directors reached an agreement to reunite the conglomerates as a single entity called ViacomCBS. National Amusements' board of directors approved the merger on October 28, 2019, which was finalized on December 4. This entity would be renamed Paramount Global on February 15, 2022.

See also 
 List of space science fiction franchises
 Outline of Star Trek
 Timeline of science fiction
Comparison of Star Wars and Star Trek

Notes

References

Further reading

External links 

 
 
 Star Trek at NASA – Enterprising Nebulae

 
American science fiction television series
Mass media franchises introduced in 1966
Paramount Global franchises
Science fantasy
Science fiction
Soft science fiction
Fiction about outer space
Space opera
Television franchises
Television shows adapted into comics
Television shows adapted into films
Television shows adapted into novels
Television shows adapted into video games